The Jockey Club Gold Cup, established in 1919, is a thoroughbred flat race open to horses of either gender three-years-old and up. It has traditionally been the main event of the fall meeting at Belmont Park, just as the Belmont Stakes is of the spring meeting and the Travers Stakes is of the summer meeting at Saratoga. The past winners of the Gold Cup are a veritable who's who of award-winning Hall of Fame horses, including Easy Goer, Man o' War, Cigar, Skip Away, Curlin, Slew o' Gold, John Henry, Affirmed, Forego, Shuvee, Damascus, Buckpasser, Kelso, Sword Dancer, Nashua, Citation, Whirlaway and War Admiral. Despite the current $1,250,000 purse and Grade 1 status, the stature of the race has suffered somewhat in recent years thanks to the emergence of the Breeders' Cup Classic held not long afterward, as well as a change in distance to  miles in 1990, reducing its distinctiveness.

Part of the Breeders' Cup Challenge series, the winner of the Jockey Club Gold Cup automatically qualifies for the Breeders' Cup Classic.

Before it was known as the Jockey Club Gold Cup, it began as the Jockey Club Stakes. This was its name when Man o' War won it against the only horse willing to race him. Damask, owned by Harry Payne Whitney, was entered as a sporting gesture and to keep Man o' War from having to run alone in a "walkover."  Damask finished 15 lengths behind with Man o' War held under strong restraint in order not to humiliate his rival. Even so, Man o' War broke the American record for a mile and a half.

Ten horses have won the race twice (including Hall of Fame horses Curlin, Skip Away, Slew o' Gold, Nashua and Triple Tiara winner, Shuvee). Only one horse in history has won the Cup five times, and that was the great gelding Kelso. 
  
In the 1978 running, Exceller defeated the previous year's Triple Crown winner, Seattle Slew, by a nose in a memorable stretch duel, with the 1978 Triple Crown winner, Affirmed, finishing fifth after his saddle slipped. Sportswriter Bill Nack wrote, "Exceller won by the snip of his chocolate nose. ... That battling final furlong remains Seattle Slew's most enduring legacy as a racehorse."

From 1958 through 1974, except for 1962 and 1968, the race was held at Aqueduct Racetrack instead of Belmont.

In 2021 the Jockey Club Gold Cup was moved to Saratoga Race Course for the first time in its history. The $1 million race is run on closing weekend and takes the place of the Woodward Stakes, which was relocated to Belmont Park after being run in Saratoga for 15 years. NYRA management believes the Jockey Club Gold Cup - run at the same distance as the Breeders' Cup Classic - is better positioned on the racing calendar with an eight week gap between the two races.

Records
Time record: (at current  miles)
 1:58.89 – Skip Away (1997)

Most wins:
 5 – Kelso (1960, 1961, 1962, 1963, 1964)

Most wins by an owner:
 5 – Glen Riddle Farm (1919, 1920, 1925, 1926, 1938)
 5 – Bohemia Stable (1960, 1961, 1962, 1963, 1964)

Most wins by a jockey:
 11 – Eddie Arcaro (1935, 1946, 1948, 1949, 1950, 1954, 1955, 1956, 1959, 1960, 1961)

Most wins by a trainer:
 6 – Jim Fitzsimmons (1929, 1930, 1933, 1934, 1955, 1956)

Winners

1In 2019, Vino Rosso finished first but was disqualified and placed second.

2In 1927, Brown Bud finished first but was disqualified.

3Only two horses started in 1920.

Notes

References
 The Jockey Club Gold Cup at Pedigree Query
 Jockey Club Gold Cup and Horse of the Year, 1936–2007

External links
 Ten Things You Should Know about the Jockey Club Gold Cup at Hello Race Fans!

Open middle distance horse races
Grade 1 stakes races in the United States
1919 establishments in New York (state)
Horse races in New York (state)
Breeders' Cup Challenge series
Belmont Park
Recurring sporting events established in 1919